Commercial Modular Buildings are code-compliant, non-residential structures that are 60% to 90% completed offsite in a factory-controlled environment. They are then transported or shipped to a final destination where the modules are then erected onto a concrete foundation to form a finished building. The word "modular" does not describe a building type or style; it simply describes a means of construction.

The commercial modular construction industry comprises two distinct divisions:

Permanent Modular Construction (PMC) – modular units built offsite for assembly onsite to create a permanent facility not intended to be relocated. They are comparable to buildings built strictly onsite in terms of quality, life span, and materials used for construction.

Relocatable Buildings – modular units built offsite for assembly onsite that can be partially or completely reused and relocated at future building sites.

Benefits 

A primary benefit of modular construction is its fast delivery.  Due to the simultaneous process of creating modules in a factory at the same time site work is occurring, modular buildings can be constructed in up to half the time as buildings built completely onsite. This allows the buildings to be occupied sooner and allows owners to see a faster return on investment.

To save the most time and money and maximize the efficiency of the modular construction process, it must be implemented at the beginning of the design-build process.

According to the UK group WRAP, (Waste and Resources Action Programme) up to a 90% reduction in materials can be achieved through the use of modular construction. Materials minimized include: wood pallets, shrink wrap, cardboard, plasterboard, timber, concrete, bricks, and cement.

Uses 

Modular builders provide all types of building space, from small temporary units to complex, multi-story permanent buildings. The most commonly served markets are education, healthcare, general office, retail and commercial housing.

Some common industrial uses may include: Application Rooms, Laser Rooms, Equipment Enclosures, Environmental Rooms, Maintenance Rooms, or Storage and Security Rooms. Commercial applications may include Offices, Reception Areas, Conference and Meeting Rooms, Copy Centers and Mail Rooms, Shipping and Receiving Rooms, Lunch Rooms and Cafeterias, Break Rooms, Dark Rooms, Training Rooms, and Storage Rooms.

See also 
Autonomous building
Modular building
Relocatable buildings
Prefabricated building
Building

References

External links
 Modular Building Institute - international trade association for commercial modular construction

Construction
Modularity
Building
Buildings and structures